The table below lists Nigerian Senators of the 5th National Assembly.
The 5th National Assembly (2003 -2007) was inaugurated on 29 May 2003. 
The Senate includes three senators from each of the 36 states, plus one senator for the Federal Capital Territory, Abuja.
Evan Enwerem, who was elected president of the Senate was succeeded by Chuba Okadigbo . Okadigbo was later replaced by Pius Anyim.

Senators

See also
Nigerian Senate

References

5th